Fire in the Oil Depot at San Marcuola was painted circa 1790 by the Venetian vedutista Francesco Guardi. It is a small oil on canvas painting on display at the Munich Alte Pinakothek. It represents one of the last paintings by Guardi who died in 1792.

The painting is based on a fire that broke out at night on November 28, 1789, in the district of Cannareggio, near the church of San Marcuola. The fire appears to be burning oil on the waters of a canal. In the foreground of the painting, a crowd of men has gathered to witness the event. In the buildings in the background, there appear to be men on rooftops appearing to fight the fire.

There is a drawing in pen and with shading by brush, owned by the Metropolitan Museum of Art.

References

1790 paintings
Paintings by Francesco Guardi
Cityscape paintings of Venice